Josceline Rose Dimbleby (née Gaskell; born 1943) is a British cookery writer. She has written seventeen cookery books, and was cookery correspondent of The Sunday Telegraph for 15 years.

Early life and education
Dimbleby was born in 1943. She is the daughter of Thomas Josceline Gaskell (1906-1982) and Barbara Jowett (died 1998), whose father Percy Hague Jowett was principal of London's Royal College of Art. In 1948, her mother Barbara Jowett married again, to Sir William Montagu-Pollock.

Dimbleby was educated at Cranborne Chase School, a former boarding independent school for girls near Tisbury in Wiltshire.

Dimbleby's great-grandmother, May Gaskell, was a "romantic confidante" of the artist Edward Burne-Jones, and a painting of her daughter Amy Gaskell by Burne-Jones is in the collection of Andrew Lloyd-Webber. In 2004, Dimbleby published A Profound Secret, about May Gaskell's life.

Selected publications

Cooking for Christmas (1978)
Marvellous Meals with Mince (1982)
A Traveller's Tastes (1986)
The Practically Vegetarian Cookbook (1994)
A Profound Secret (2004)
Orchards in the Oasis – Recipes, Travels and Memories (2010)

Personal life
She has three children with her former husband, the broadcaster David Dimbleby, including Henry Dimbleby and Kate Dimbleby.

References

External links

1943 births
Diet food advocates
Josceline
English food writers
English television presenters
Living people
People educated at Cranborne Chase School
Place of birth missing (living people)
Telegraph Media Group
Women cookbook writers
Women food writers